Lake Sahuaccocha (Quechua sawa marriage, qucha lake) is a lake in Peru located in the Ayacucho Region, Lucanas Province, Chipao District. Sawaqucha lies northeast of the lakes named Yawriwiri, Urqunqucha and Kunturqucha, northwest of Tipiqucha, Pukaqucha, another lake named Urqunqucha (slightly smaller than the lake mentioned before) and Islaqucha, and north of Lake Apiñaccocha.

See also
List of lakes in Peru

References

Lakes of Peru
Lakes of Ayacucho Region